Sawyers Bay is a suburb of the New Zealand city of Dunedin.

The suburb, on the western shore of Otago Harbour, lies between the two rocky headlands of Port Chalmers in the east and Roseneath in the west. The South Island Main Trunk rail line and State Highway 88 run along the shore of the bay.

The name of the suburb is indicative of the occupation of many of its early settlers; the Sawyers Bay area provided much of the timber used in the early construction industry around both Dunedin and Port Chalmers area. Little remains of Sawyers Bay's early industries; it is now largely a residential suburb.

Sawyers Bay's residential area is situated around one long street which runs inland from the bay itself. This street is called Station Road at its coastal end, and Hall Road further inland. At the coastal end, it connects with State Highway 88, the highway which runs along the west coast of Otago Harbour from Port Chalmers to Dunedin via Saint Leonards and Ravensbourne. Inland from here, roads branch off the main road – the most important of these is Stevenson Avenue, which connects with a back road to Port Chalmers (Borlases Road) in the east, and with Upper Junction Road in the west. Upper Junction Road, the winding old road to Port Chalmers from the Dunedin suburb of North East Valley, rises to join with the old Mount Cargill road, which was itself the former main road north out of Dunedin, linking the city's main urban area at Normanby with Waitati.

Other notable features of Sawyers Bay include the Port Chalmers Golf Course, located in the north of Sawyers Bay. A bush walk, Grahams Bush, links the end of Hall Road with the Mount Cargill road. Sawyers Bay's most prolific family is the McLachlan clan, whose tenement dates back to pre-European settlement. Its current population base is now comprised by residents reliant on the marine environment and a large contingent of Firefighters

Demographics

Sawyers Bay had a population of 1,095 at the 2018 New Zealand census, an increase of 99 people (9.9%) since the 2013 census, and an increase of 63 people (6.1%) since the 2006 census. There were 444 households. There were 549 males and 543 females, giving a sex ratio of 1.01 males per female, with 237 people (21.6%) aged under 15 years, 147 (13.4%) aged 15 to 29, 522 (47.7%) aged 30 to 64, and 189 (17.3%) aged 65 or older.

Ethnicities were 94.2% European/Pākehā, 12.1% Māori, 2.2% Pacific peoples, 1.9% Asian, and 2.2% other ethnicities (totals add to more than 100% since people could identify with multiple ethnicities).

Although some people objected to giving their religion, 60.0% had no religion, 30.4% were Christian, 0.3% were Buddhist and 2.7% had other religions.

Of those at least 15 years old, 186 (21.7%) people had a bachelor or higher degree, and 192 (22.4%) people had no formal qualifications. The employment status of those at least 15 was that 438 (51.0%) people were employed full-time, 120 (14.0%) were part-time, and 27 (3.1%) were unemployed.

Roseneath-Sawyers Bay statistical area

Roseneath-Sawyers Bay had a population of 1,449 at the 2018 New Zealand census, an increase of 132 people (10.0%) since the 2013 census, and an increase of 54 people (3.9%) since the 2006 census. There were 594 households. There were 714 males and 735 females, giving a sex ratio of 0.97 males per female. The median age was 44.2 years (compared with 37.4 years nationally), with 294 people (20.3%) aged under 15 years, 195 (13.5%) aged 15 to 29, 708 (48.9%) aged 30 to 64, and 249 (17.2%) aged 65 or older.

Ethnicities were 94.0% European/Pākehā, 11.0% Māori, 2.1% Pacific peoples, 2.3% Asian, and 2.3% other ethnicities (totals add to more than 100% since people could identify with multiple ethnicities).

The proportion of people born overseas was 14.7%, compared with 27.1% nationally.

Although some people objected to giving their religion, 60.2% had no religion, 30.2% were Christian, 0.4% were Buddhist and 2.7% had other religions.

Of those at least 15 years old, 294 (25.5%) people had a bachelor or higher degree, and 228 (19.7%) people had no formal qualifications. The median income was $33,400, compared with $31,800 nationally. 210 people (18.2%) earned over $70,000 compared to 17.2% nationally. The employment status of those at least 15 was that 588 (50.9%) people were employed full-time, 174 (15.1%) were part-time, and 42 (3.6%) were unemployed.

Education
Sawyers Bay School is a state contributing primary school serving years 1 to 6 with a roll of  students as of  The school was established in 1861.

References

Dann, C. and Peat, N. (1989) Dunedin, North and South Otago. Wellington: GP Books. .

Suburbs of Dunedin
Populated places in Otago
Port Chalmers
Bays of Otago